Redden was a town located in northeastern Atoka County, Oklahoma, United States, on State Highway 43, approximately 13 miles northeast of Stringtown.

The Postal Service established a post office at Redden, Indian Territory on June 1, 1903, in what was then Atoka County, Choctaw Nation. It was named for John A. Redden (1873), a local resident who was appointed the first postmaster. The Statehood Proclamation was signed November 16, 1907. The post office at Redden, Oklahoma, was closed permanently on October 31, 1954.

In similar fashion to Daisy, Redden was once a firmly established, thriving community. However, Redden is now little more than a small dot on the map. All that remains of the old town is the Redden Cemetery, fenced and well kept, and the ruins of the schoolhouse standing on the side of the road. Redden is considered a ghost town.

Utilities
Telephone and Internet is provided by Hilliary Communications.

References

External links
RoadsideThoughts.com - A visit to Redden, Oklahoma - with county map
Redden Cemetery

Geography of Atoka County, Oklahoma
Ghost towns in Oklahoma

io:Atoka, Oklahoma